Boamponsem (died 1694) was a Denkyirahene, or ruler of the Denkyira people, from the 1650s until his death in 1694. 

Denkyira was an African nation that existed in Ghana before the United Kingdom incorporated the Gold Coast into the British Empire. The Denkyira people maintain tribal identity and their traditional royalty despite losing their independence and sovereignty.

In 1692, Boamponsem sent an envoy to the Gold Coast to engage with the newly encamped Dutch and English trading posts and military installations, to gather intelligence, trade, and advocate his people's interests. Boamponsem is remembered in Denkyiran tradition as a successful but autocratic ruler. He was also named after the Boa Amponsem Senior High School in Dunkwa-on-Offin

Sources
McKaskie, T. C. "Denkyira in the Making of Asante" in The Journal of African History Vol. 48 (2007) no. 1, p. 1-2

Year of birth unknown
1694 deaths
History of Ghana
Ghanaian royalty

References